The Catcher in the Rye is a 1951 novel by  J. D. Salinger.

The Catcher in the Rye may also refer to:

 Catcher in the Rye (band), a Chinese punk rock band
 "Catcher in the Rye", a 2008 song by Guns N' Roses from Chinese Democracy

See also 
 Catcher in the Wry, an autobiography by Bob Uecker
 Coming Through the Rye  2015 film directed by James Steven Sadwith